This is a list of museums in Haiti.

List 
 Expressions Art Gallery
 Musee de Guahaba
 Museé d'Art Nader
 Musée du Bureau d’Ethnologie
 Musee du Pantheon National
 Musée du Peuple de Fermathe
 Musée Georges Liautaud
 Musée Ogier
 Musée Vaudou (Collection Marianne Lehmann)
 National Museum of Art, Haiti
 National Museum of Haiti
 Parc historique de la Canne à sucre
 Sans-Souci Palace and the Citadelle Laferrière

External links 
 Museums in Haiti Assessments and Interpretations
 http://www.tripadvisor.com/Travel-g147306-s410/Haiti:Caribbean:Museums.And.Attractions.html

Haiti
 
Museums
Haiti
Museums